Cuyodynerus is a small Andean genus of potter wasps.

References

Potter wasps